The 78th Flying Training Wing was a wing of the United States Army Air Forces.  It was last assigned to the Central Flying Training Command, and was disbanded on 30 June 1945 at the San Antonio Aviation Cadet Center, Texas.

The wing was a World War II unit for the classification and preflight testing of aviation cadets.  It was one of three such centers, the others being at Maxwell Field, Alabama and Santa Ana Army Air Base, California.

There is no lineage between the current United States Air Force 78th Air Base Wing, established on 24 September 1948 at Hamilton Air Force Base, California, and this organization.

History
The mission of the wing was to provide both Classification and Preflight stage training to air cadets which had completed Training Command basic indoctrination training.

 Classification Stage processed the cadet and issued him his equipment. This was the stage where it would be decided whether the cadet would train as a navigator, bombardier, or pilot.
 Pre-Flight Stage taught the mechanics and physics of flight and required the cadets to pass courses in mathematics and the hard sciences. Then the cadets were taught to apply their knowledge practically by teaching them aeronautics, deflection shooting, and thinking in three dimensions.

Once the cadet successfully completed the training at the center, they would be assigned to one of the AAF primary flight schools for initial flying training.

Lineage
 Established as 78th Flying Training Wing on 14 August 1943
 Activated on 25 August 1943
 Disbanded on 30 June 1945

Assignments
 Army Air Forces Central Flying Training Command, 25 August 1943 – 30 June 1945

Units
 Army Air Forces Classification Center, 30 April 1942 – 1 May 1944
 885th Classification Center Squadron, 4 July 1942
 886th Classification Center Squadron, 4 July 1942
 888th Classification Center Squadron, 4 July 1942
Squadrons re-designated as squadrons "E", "F", "G", 2535th AAFBU, 1 May 1944

 Army Air Forces Preflight School (Pilot), 30 April 1942
 Re-designated: 330th Training Group, 17 August 1942 – 1 May 1944
 881st Preflight Training Squadron, 4 July 1942
 882d Preflight Training Squadron, 4 July 1942
 883d Preflight Training Squadron, 4 July 1942
 884th Preflight Training Squadron, 4 July 1942
Squadrons re-designated as squadrons "A", "B", "C", "D", 2535th AAFBU, 1 May 1944

 2535th Army Air Forces Base Unit, 1 May 1944 – 30 June 1945
 Kelly Field, San Antonio, Texas
 AAF Pilot School (Advanced, Two-Engine) June 1941 – March 1943 (AT-9, AT-10)
 61st*, 62d*, 63d*, 64th*, 389th, 390th, 1028th, 1048th, 1097th, 1098th, 1099th Two-Engine Flying Training Squadrons
 Flying training ended at Kelly, March 1943, base was transferred to Air Service Command

 Duncan Field, San Antonio, Texas
 AAF Pilot School (Basic) Jan 1942 – Feb 1943 (BT-9, BT-13)
 492d, 667th, 1029th, 1030th Basic Flying Training Squadrons
 Duncan Field merged into Kelly Field, March 1943

*Squadrons formed on 1 September 1936 as part of the Air Corps Primary Flying School detachment at Kelly Field; 61st (Pursuit); 62d (Observation); 63d (Attack); 64th (Bombardment); re-designated Two-Engine squadrons 16 June 1941

Stations
 San Antonio Aviation Cadet Center, Texas, 25 August 1943 – 30 June 1945

See also

 Army Air Forces Training Command
 Other Training Command Preflight/classification Units:
 74th Flying Training Wing (World War II) Eastern Flying Training Command
 81st Flying Training Wing (World War II) Western Flying Training Command

 Other Central Flying Training Command Flight Training Wings:
 31st Flying Training Wing (World War II) Primary Flight Training
 32d Flying Training Wing (World War II) Basic Flight Training
 33d Flying Training Wing (World War II) Advanced Flight Training, Two Engine
 34th Flying Training Wing (World War II) Bombardier and Specialized Two/Four-Engine Training
 77th Flying Training Wing (World War II) Advanced Flight Training, Single Engine
 79th Flying Training Wing (World War II) Gunnery
 80th Flying Training Wing (World War II) Navigation and Glider

References

Training wings of the United States Army Air Forces
Military units and formations established in 1943
Military units and formations disestablished in 1945
1943 establishments in Texas
1945 disestablishments in Texas